

Arthropods

Newly named insects

Archosauromorphs

Newly named dinosaurs
Data courtesy of George Olshevsky's dinosaur genera list.

Plesiosaurs

New taxa

Synapsids

Non-mammalian

People
 Death of Harry Govier Seeley, the paleontologist who invented the Saurischian/Ornithischian dinosaur dichotomy.

References